Darren A Douglass Reed (born October 16, 1965) is a former professional outfielder.  He played with the New York Mets in 1990 and with both the Montreal Expos and Minnesota Twins in 1992.  He played a total of 82 Major League games, 26 for the Mets, 42 for the Expos and 14 for the Twins.  Overall, he had a major league batting average of .183 with 6 home runs and 16 runs batted in.

Reed also played 791 minor league baseball games between 1984 and 1996.  He played minor league games in the Atlanta Braves', Oakland Athletics' and New York Yankees' organizations in addition to the Mets' and Expos'.  As a minor leaguer he had a batting average of .281 with 90 home runs and 381 runs batted in.  He also pitched one inning for the Richmond Braves in 1995 without giving up a run.  He also played part of the 1994 season with the Leones de Yucatán in the Mexican League.

References

1965 births
Living people
American expatriate baseball players in Canada
American expatriate baseball players in Mexico
Baseball players from California
Buffalo Bisons (minor league) players
Columbus Clippers players
Duluth-Superior Dukes players
Fort Lauderdale Yankees players
Indianapolis Indians players
Leones de Yucatán players
Major League Baseball outfielders
Minnesota Twins players
Montreal Expos players
New York Mets players
People from Ojai, California
Richmond Braves players
Sportspeople from Ventura County, California
Tidewater Tides players
Ventura Pirates baseball players
West Palm Beach Expos players
Albany-Colonie Yankees players
Oneonta Yankees players